Destiny is a mainly feminine name meaning "destiny, fate", from the Latin word "destinare," meaning "to determine." It has been a popular name in the United States, where it was ranked in the top 50 names given to baby girls between 1997 and 2008. It has since declined in use but remains among the top 500 names given to American girls.

People with this name
 Destiny Carter, American track and field athlete
 Destiny Chukunyere, Maltese singer
 Destiny Clark, American singer, songwriter, and beauty pageant titleholder
 Destiny Hope Cyrus, the birth name of American singer, songwriter, and actress Miley Cyrus
 Destiny Deacon, Australian photographer
 Destiny Ekaragha, British film director
 Destiny Etiko, Nigerian actress
 Destiny Frasqueri, better known as Princess Nokia, American rapper
 Destiny Herndon-De La Rosa, American activist
 Destiny Lightsy, American actress, singer and dancer
 Destiny Norton, American murder victim
 Destiny Slocum, American basketball player
 Destiny Udogie, Italian football player
 Destiny Vaeao, American football defensive tackle
 Destiny Vélez, Miss Puerto Rico 2015
 Destiny Williams, American basketball forward

Fictional characters
 Destiny Baker, a character from the Disney Channel sitcom Bunk'd
 Destiny, a whale shark and a character in the 2016 Disney/Pixar animated film Finding Dory
 Destiny, a character from Captain Scarlet and the Mysterons
 Destiny Evans, a character from the soap opera One Life to Live
 Destiny Rose, main character of the Philippine drama of the same name

See also
 Destiney Sue Moore, an American television personality

References

English feminine given names